The Singles is a greatest hits compilation by Australian singer Dannii Minogue. It was released by Mushroom Records on 3 November 1998 in Australia only. The album features all fourteen of Minogue's singles released between 1990 and 1998. The tracklist opts for the original album versions of each song rather than their respective single versions, with the exceptions of "Jump to the Beat" and "Baby Love", which were not included on Minogue's original debut, Dannii. The album includes the UK-only single "Love's on Every Corner" and the Australian-only single "Coconut", which was a hidden track on Girl. Since the compilation was a budget release, it was ineligible to chart on the Australian albums chart.

Track listing
"Love and Kisses" – 3:44
"Success" – 5:34
"Jump to the Beat" (7" Mix) – 3:36
"Baby Love"  (7" Mix) – 3:45
"I Don't Wanna Take This Pain" – 4:53
"Show You the Way to Go" – 4:22
"Love's on Every Corner" – 4:15
"This Is It" – 3:40
"This is the Way" – 3:59
"Get into You" – 4:13
"All I Wanna Do" – 4:30
"Everything I Wanted" – 4:40
"Disremembrance" – 4:07
"Coconut" – 4:51

References

Dannii Minogue compilation albums
1998 compilation albums